Gun Lake is a lake in Mason County, Michigan, in the United States.

The lake most likely was named for Luther , a local politician and businessman in the lumber industry.

See also
List of rivers of Michigan

References

Lakes of Michigan
Bodies of water of Mason County, Michigan